The 2011 Women's Hockey Under–21 Four Nations Tournament was an invitational women's under–21 field hockey competition, hosted by Hockey India. The tournament took place between 8–12 November 2011 in New Delhi, India. A total of four teams competed for the title.

Germany won the tournament, defeating New Zealand 3–2 during golden goal in the final. India finished in third place after a 3–2 win over Australia.

Teams
Including India, 4 teams were invited by Hockey India to participate in the tournament.

 
 
  (host nation)

Officials
The following umpires were appointed by the International Hockey Federation to officiate the tournament:

 Sarah Allanson (AUS)
 Vilma Bagdanskiene (LTU)
 Suman Leta Chumbak (IND)
 Amber Church (NZL)
 Sandra Wagner (GER)

Results
All times are local (UTC+05:30).

Preliminary round

Fixtures

Classification round

Third and fourth place

Final

Awards

Statistics

Final standings

Goalscorers

References

External links
Hockey India

2011 in women's field hockey
2011 in Australian women's field hockey
2011 in Indian women's sport
2011 in German women's sport
2011 in New Zealand women's sport
International women's field hockey competitions hosted by India
November 2011 sports events in India